

Multnomah County
BodyVox
Do Jump
The Jefferson Dancers
Oregon Ballet Theatre

Washington County
NW Fusion Dance Company

Lane County

 Ballet Fantastique
 Eugene Ballet

Dance companies
 
Oregon
Dance companies in the United States